Pikku Kakkonen (Finnish for "the little number two") is an ongoing Finnish magazine-type children's TV show shown on Yle TV2. The first episode aired on January 11, 1977. It finished with a bedtime story read by the late Lasse Pöysti (1927-2019) and an East German Sandman animation, setting the format for hundreds of later episodes.
 Currently the series airs twice a day (mornings and night) on the weekdays and once a day (mornings only) on the weekends. 
The Pikku Kakkonen show is based in Tampere, and its signature melodies (The Pikku Kakkonen mail tune and the main title tune) have been made into mobile phone ringing tones. On October 25, 1983, Pikku Kakkonen introduced a new logo that consists of a moon, a flower, a teddybear, a doll, a ghost, a fish, and a bird which together form the number 2; this matches the frequency for Yle's secondary channel. Pikku Kakkonen'''s current intro animation is illustrated by Camilla Mickwitz who was responsible for designing and animating the stop-motion opening and ending sequences. This logo has become a trademark symbol of Pikku Kakkonen. It will permanently remain in use.

A variety of live-action and animated television series air as part of Pikku Kakkonen, both domestic and imported. The imported series are mainly animated and have all been dubbed and localized into Finnish. The domestic series are mainly live-action.

Pikku Kakkonen is targeted at an audience of preschool and elementary school-aged children. It has a counterpart for older children called Galaxi which also airs on Yle TV2. Galaxi broadcasts live-action and animated television series both from Finland and overseas, all in the Finnish language.

Characters and series
 Käytöskukka Kössi Kenguru Pat ja Mat Pelle Hermanni from 1978
 Nalle Luppakorva from 1979
 Lohikäärme Justus Taikuri Savinen Karvakuonot: Ransu, Eno-Elmeri and Riku, from 1978
 Timo Taikuri from 1979
 Rölli from 1986
 Ti-ti Nalle from 1989
 Taikuri Luttinen from 1995
 Runoja ja Rusinoita from 2017
 Reppu-Heppu ja Botti'' from 2021
Many of these have been spun off as separate TV shows, theatre films or books. Currently, Ti-Ti Nalle music videos no longer air on Yle TV2 or as part of Pikku Kakkonen; rather, they air on C More Juniori between programs.

External links
 Official site (in Finnish)

References

Finnish children's television series
Yle original programming